The Jacchia Reference Atmosphere is a reference atmospheric model that defines values for atmospheric temperature, density, pressure and other properties at altitudes from 90 to 2500 km. Unlike the more common US Standard Atmosphere and related models, the Jacchia model includes latitudinal, seasonal, geomagnetic, and solar effects, but must be supplemented with another model at lower altitudes. The model, first published in 1970 and updated in 1971 and 1977, is based on spacecraft drag data, and is primarily used in spacecraft
modeling and related fields. 

A common assumption while using the Jacchia Model is that the atmosphere rotates with the Earth as a rigid body.

The statistical accuracy of the Jacchia Model is 15%.

See also
Atmospheric models
NRLMSISE-00
International Standard Atmosphere
US Standard Atmosphere

External links
 NASA GSFC ModelWeb Jacchia page

References
 L. G. Jacchia, Static Diffusion Models of the Upper Atmosphere with Empirical Temperature Profiles, Smithson. Astrophys. Obs. Spec. Rept. No. 170, Cambridge, Massachusetts, 1964. (B08448) 
 L. G. Jacchia, Revised Static Models of the Thermosphere and Exosphere with Empirical Temperature Profiles, Smithson. Astrophys. Obs. Spec. Rept. No. 332, 1971. (B10091) 
 L. G. Jacchia, Thermospheric Temperature, Density, and Composition: New Models, Smithson. Astrophys. Obs. Spec. Rept. No. 375, 1977. 

Atmosphere